Westendorf may refer to:

Places
Westendorf, Tyrol, Kitzbühel district, Austria
Westendorf (Allgäu), Ostallgäu district, Bavaria, Germany
Westendorf (Schmutter), Augsburg district, Bavaria, Germany
Westendorf (Rinteln), Schaumburg district, Lower Saxony, Germany

People
 Anke Westendorf (later Maukel) (born 1954), German volleyball player
 Thomas Westendorf (1848–1923), American composer
 Uwe Westendorf (born 1966), German freestyle wrestler
 Wolfhart Westendorf (1924–2018), German Egyptologist